Thomas H. Bell (born August 2, 1944) is an American football and lacrosse coach.  He served as the head football coach at Plymouth State University (1972–1975), the University of New Haven (1976–1982), the United States Coast Guard Academy (1986–1992), and Macalester College (1994–1997), compiling a career college football record of 95–102–6.  Bell was also the head men's lacrosse coach at New Haven from 1979 to 1980, tallying a mark of 4–18.

Coaching career
Bell was the head football coach for the Coast Guard Bears located in New London, Connecticut.  He held that position for seven seasons, from 1986 until 1992.  His coaching record at Coast Guard was 38 wins and 28 losses. Bell took over mostly losing football programs and was able to transform them into winners. During his career he was able to change the fortunes of Plymouth State University, the University of New Haven and the United States Coast Guard Academy.

Head coaching record

College football

References

1944 births
Living people
Coast Guard Bears football coaches
Dean Bulldogs football coaches
Macalester Scots football coaches
New Haven Chargers football coaches
Plymouth State Panthers football coaches
Yale Bulldogs football coaches
Westfield State Owls football coaches
College men's lacrosse coaches in the United States
High school football coaches in Massachusetts
University of Connecticut alumni